The Communist Party (often abbreviated KP) was a political party in Flanders, Belgium.  It was founded in 1989 in the aftermath of the split of the Communist Party of Belgium along linguistic lines. The political secretary of the KP was Jaak Perquy. KP was dissolved in 2009.

The KP published a newspaper, Agora.  The youth wing evolved into Graffiti Jeugddienst, an apolitical youth association, in the early 1990s.  Later another youth wing, Jong-KP, was established.

References

1989 establishments in Belgium
2009 disestablishments in Belgium
Defunct communist parties in Belgium
Flemish political parties in Belgium
Party of the European Left former member parties
Political parties disestablished in 2009
Political parties established in 1989